γ-Tocopherol (gamma-tocopherol) is a tocopherol and one of the chemical compounds that comprise vitamin E.  As a food additive, it has E number E308.

See also
 α-Tocopherol
 β-Tocopherol
 δ-Tocopherol

References

Vitamin E
E-number additives